Nil Kıyısında is Turkish pop music singer Nil Karaibrahimgil's fourth studio album, released in 2009. The first track, "Seviyorum Sevmiyorum" was sent to radio in January 2009. The music video for the song was shot by Umur Turagay, and the song peaked #1 at Billboard Turkey list. "İlla" features famous Turkish singer Mazhar Alanson from "MFÖ".

The working title for the album was "The River Nile". Unlike her previous records, she didn't work with Ozan Çolakoğlu. Instead, she worked with Alper Erinç, who was best known with his works made with Turkish singer Göksel.

Track listing

All songs written by Nil Karaibrahimgil, except "Seviyorum Sevmiyorum" and "Kırık" are cowritten with Alper Erinç.

Personnel
Nil Karaibrahimgil: Main Vocal
Alper Erinç: Acoustic and electric guitars, mandolin on track 10
Yıldıran Güz: Lute on tracks 2 and 4
Rafet Alık: Zither on track 2
Alp Ersönmez: Bass on all tracks except 9
İzzet Kızıl: Percussion
Veysel Samanlıoğlu: Violin and various strings
Atilla Kiviv, Kadir Okyay, Muhittin Darıcı, Sendur Güzelel: Strings on tracks 1-4, 6, 8 and 9

Production
All songs arranged by Alper Erinç, except track 9 (arranged by Hakan Özer)
Produced by Alper Erinç
Recorded by Alper Gemici
Mixed by Michael Zimmerling
Mastered by Stuart Hawkes

Music videos
 Seviyorum Sevmiyorum
 Duma Duma Dum
 Kırık

References

Nil Karaibrahimgil albums
2009 albums